Robert Vance (born 1955) is a New Zealand cricketer.

Robert Vance may also refer to:

Robert B. Vance (1828–1899), U.S. Representative from North Carolina, nephew or Robert Brank Vance
Robert Brank Vance (1793–1827), U.S. Representative from North Carolina, uncle of Robert B. Vance
Robert J. Vance (1854–1902), U.S. Representative from Connecticut
Robert Smith Vance (1931–1989), U.S. Court of Appeals judge
Robert C. Vance (1894–1959), Connecticut newspaper publisher and philanthropist

See also
 Bob Vance (disambiguation)